Vincent M. Benham served as the eighth Secretary of State of Alabama from 1852 to 1856.

References 

Year of birth missing
Alabama Democrats
Secretaries of State of Alabama
1865 deaths